The 1964 Argentine Primera División was the 73rd season of top-flight football in Argentina. The season began on April 26 and ended on November 29.

Boca Juniors won the championship (15th league title) with no teams relegated.

League standings

References

Argentine Primera División seasons
Argentine Primera Division
1